Huaiyang may refer to:

Huaiyang County, in Henan, China
Huaiyang cuisine, centered upon Yangzhou and Huai'an in Jiangsu, China
Kingdom of Huaiyang, a vassal kingdom of the Han dynasty